Michigan Island is one of the Apostle Islands located in western Lake Superior, off the Bayfield Peninsula, in northern Wisconsin. This island has no human inhabitants, and is managed by the National Park Service as part of the Apostle Islands National Lakeshore. It is centered at approximately 46.87° N 90.49° W and has a maximum elevation of 758' above sea level.  Along its shores, it rises about 48 feet above Lake Superior's official elevation of 602'. The Michigan Island Light, which has two towers, is located on the island.

See also
 Wisconsin lighthouses

External links
 NPS website on the Apostle Islands
 Apostle Islands: Volunteers in the Park (VIP) Program with information on the lighthouse

Apostle Islands
Islands of Ashland County, Wisconsin
Uninhabited islands of the United States